This is a list of mutual-fund families in Canada ranked by Canadian mutual fund assets under management (AUM), as of May 31, 2008.

Footnotes

See also
List of investment management firms

Mutual-fund families
Mutual fund